The National Association of Free & Charitable Clinics (NAFC) is a national non-profit association of free medical clinics in the United States, which are themselves community-based, non-profit, volunteer-supported free clinics serving the people without or with little health insurance.

The national organization performs public policy advocacy and acts as a conduit for donations to free clinics.

References

Choi, Candice. Free clinics meeting a need. The Associated Press via Seattle Times - Wednesday, February 22, 2006
United States Senator Judd Gregg : About Senator Gregg – Awards

External links
National Association of Free & Charitable Clinics
Free & Charitable Clinics | Benefits Explorer

Health charities in the United States
Clinics in the United States
Medical and health organizations based in Virginia